In general relativity and tensor calculus, the Palatini identity is:

where  denotes the variation of Christoffel symbols and  indicates covariant differentiation.

A proof can be found in the entry Einstein–Hilbert action.

The "same" identity holds for the Lie derivative . In fact, one has:

where  denotes any vector field on the spacetime manifold .

See also
Einstein–Hilbert action
Palatini variation
Ricci calculus
Tensor calculus
Christoffel symbols
Riemann curvature tensor

Notes

References
  [English translation by R. Hojman and C. Mukku in P. G. Bergmann and V. De Sabbata (eds.) Cosmology and Gravitation, Plenum Press, New York (1980)]

Equations of physics
Tensors
General relativity